Dzibanche (sometimes spelt Tz'ibanche) is an archaeological site of the ancient Maya civilization located in southern Quintana Roo, in the Yucatan Peninsula of southeastern Mexico. Dzibanche was a major Maya city and investigations in the first decade of the 21st century indicate that it was the early capital of the Kan dynasty, which later ruled from the great city of Calakmul. Dzibanche features the earliest known use of the Kaan dynasty emblem glyph.

Location and etymology 
The name Dzibanche means "writing on wood" in the Mayan language; taking its name from the sculpted wooden lintels of the Temple of the Lintels. The ruins lie in the south of Mexico's Quintana Roo state, a short distance inland from the Bacalar Lagoon. The ruins of the city are situated on a raised area surrounded by an extensive area of seasonal swampland, known as a bajo, featuring particularly fertile soils.

History 
During the Early Classic period of Mesoamerican chronology the city may have been the seat of the Kan ("snake") dynasty that later ruled from Calakmul to the southwest; Dzibanche appears to have been the Kan capital in the 5th and 6th centuries. The hieroglyphic stairway at Dzibanche contains the earliest known use of the Kan dynasty Emblem glyph, dated to AD 495. Around 580 to 590, the Kan dynasty apparently moved their dynastic seat to Calakmul. At the end of the Terminal Classic period, Dzibanche was one of the last cities in the Maya area to create a dated hieroglyphic text, in AD 909.

Site description 

Dzibanche was a large city featuring architecture in the Peten style. Excavations have uncovered a hieroglyphic stairway depicting sculpted representations of bound captives, captured by Yuknoom Ch'een I, a Kan dynasty king of Dzibanche. One of these captives is named as Yax K'ahk' Jolo'm and, although his place of origin is not mentioned in the accompanying text, the form of his name indicates that he came from a city relatively close to Dzibanche itself. At least two of sculpted blocks may date to the 5th century AD.

The most important structures at Dzibanche include the Temple of the Captives, the Temple of the Lintels and the Temple of the Owl. The K'inichna' Pyramid is a large temple located outside of the site core. The Lamay Group is a small outlying architectural group that formed a part of the city.

The  Cormoranes Pyramid is the largest pyramid at Dizibanche. It was built during the 5th century AD using the Teotihuacan-influenced talud-tablero style of Maya architecture. The pyramid is decorated with friezes that were sculpted from stucco and coated with red paint; the friezes feature symbols that are also in the Teotihuacan style. The structure is the funerary pyramid of Sky Witness, one of the kings of the Kan dynasty.

Two royal burials were discovered inside the structure, accompanied by jade offerings. The K'inich Na' Pyramid is surrounded by a number of smaller palace-type structures and the group is linked to the site core by a causeway. The group was likely to be the home of an elite lineage group and was placed to extend the city's region of control over the northern parts of the surrounding bajo.

Notes

Gallery

References

Further reading

 

Maya sites in Quintana Roo